"Slid/Timeless Land" is a single by the English electronic music band Fluke and Yothu Yindi. Released as a split single this release featured a previously unheard remix of Slid.

Versions

Fluke (band) songs